Iulian Mihai Ilie, (born 29 November 1972, Ploieşti, Romania), is a Romanian football player, who plays as a goalkeeper. He is currently a free agent.

External links

1972 births
Living people
Sportspeople from Ploiești
Romanian footballers
Association football goalkeepers
FC Petrolul Ploiești players
CS Mioveni players